The Tui Namosi is a chiefly title  held by the Paramount Chief of Namosi Province on the main island of Viti Levu, Fiji.

Titles History
The clan's progenitor Robatiratu was the vunivalu at the Yavutu of Nabukebuke at Wailase in the Wainimala highlands. Under the leadership of Robatiratu's sons Ronawaqaliva and Rodrodrolagi, the clan then moved to Nairairaikinabukebuke, Mount Voma where they built a village on the left bank of the Waidina River and called it Namosi. The Vunivalu of the Nabukebuke clan was also installed Tui Namosi at this village.

Current Title Holder
The current Tui Namosi is Ratu Suliano Matanitobua.

Footnotes

References
From Election to Coup in Fiji: The 2006 Campaign and Its Aftermath, by Jonathan Fraenkel, Stewart Firth, Published by ANU E Press
The Cyclopedia of Fiji: A Complete Historical and Commercial Review of Fiji,Published 1984 by R. McMillan, Fiji, 332 pages, Original from the University of Michigan, Digitized 3 Apr 2007
The Pacific Way: A Memoir, By Ratu Sir Kamisese Mara, University of Hawaii Press, 1997
The Journal of the Polynesian Society, By Polynesian Society (N. Z.), Published 1943.

External links
Reference to Tui Namosi on Fiji Government Online

Tui Namosi